Eunoe senta is a scale worm described from Greenland, where it was collected by the Peary Relief Expedition in August 1892.

Description
Number of segments 36; elytra 15 pairs. Dorsum pale yellow or colorless. prostomium anterior margin comprising a pair of acute anterior projections. Lateral antennae inserted ventrally (beneath prostomium and median antenna). Notochaetae about as thick as neurochaetae. Bidentate neurochaetae absent.

References

Phyllodocida